Ilorin International Airport  is an airport serving Ilorin, a city in Kwara State of Nigeria.

Airlines and destinations

Accidents and incidents
In May 2019, a Diamond DA42 Twin Star light aircraft, registration number 5N-BNH, belly landed on the runway at Ilorin. The two occupants were unharmed.

See also
Transport in Nigeria
List of airports in Nigeria

References

External links

OurAirports - Ilorin
SkyVector - Ilorin

Airports in Nigeria
Ilorin
Airports in Yorubaland